Prithvi Nath Dhar (P.N. Dhar, 1 March 1919 – 19 July 2012) was an Indian economist and the head of Indira Gandhi's secretariat and one of her closest advisers.

Early life and career
P. N. Dhar was born into a Kashmiri Pandit family on 1919 to Dr. Vishnu Hakim and Radha Hakim. His wife was the singer-writer Sheila Dhar. He attended Tyndale Biscoe School in Srinagar, India, and then studied economics at the Hindu College of the University of Delhi.

Dhar served as Principal Secretary to the Prime Minister Indira Gandhi during the tumultuous days of the Emergency (1973–1977). He was one of her close advisors, who were collectively known as the "Kashmiri Mafia".

He was also a professor of economics at Delhi University for many years and the Director and Emeritus Professor of the Institute of Economic Growth in New Delhi.

He was one of the founders of the Delhi School of Economics. He served as the United Nations Assistant Secretary General, Research and Policy Analysis, in New York from 1978 to 1986.

He was awarded the Padma Vibushan, India's second highest civilian award in 2008.

His memoir, Indira Gandhi, the Emergency, and Indian Democracy was published in 2000.

References

1919 births
2012 deaths
20th-century Indian economists
Academic staff of Delhi University
Delhi University alumni
Delhi School of Economics alumni
Indian officials of the United Nations
Writers from Jammu and Kashmir
Recipients of the Padma Vibhushan in civil service
20th-century Indian biographers
Indian male writers
Indira Gandhi
Scientists from Jammu and Kashmir